Leonard "Jim" James Anderson  27 May 1931 – 27 June 2019) was a loyalist paramilitary leader from Northern Ireland, who from April to December 1972, was the acting leader of the Ulster Defence Association (UDA) while its commander and the founder of the organisation, Charles Harding Smith was in jail on remand for gun-running. Upon the latter's return, Anderson, together with Harding Smith, was joint chairman of the UDA until he stood down in the spring of 1973. In the battle between Harding Smith and East Belfast brigadier, Tommy Herron for the succession to the leadership, a compromise candidate, Andy Tyrie, was appointed as chairman.

UDA formation
Anderson, a Protestant glazier from the Crumlin Road area of Belfast, was an early member of a loyalist vigilante group, the Woodvale Defence Association (WDA). Anderson's base of operation was the mid-Shankill, which runs parallel to the Crumlin Road, where he garnered a reputation as a good organiser and worked closely with Billy Hull. Anderson was present at the September 1971 meeting where the Woodvale Defence Association merged with other vigilante groups to form the Ulster Defence Association (UDA). At this meeting Hull was chosen as chairman of the new group with Alan Moon of the lower Shankill vice-chairman; although before long Anderson replaced Moon in this role. Moon, who had become reluctant to be involved in vigilantism since the group's formation, willingly stepped aside and ended his association with the UDA soon afterwards. The structure of this new movement soon took shape with a thirteen-man Security Council established in January 1972 as a reaction to a Provisional IRA bomb the previous month at the  Balmoral furniture showroom on the Shankill which killed four people including two infants. Anderson was one of the members of this Council.

Leadership
In April 1972, the organisation's leader, Charles Harding Smith and leading UDA member John White were arrested in London for gun-trafficking.  A temporary de facto leadership assumed control and Anderson became the acting chairman of the UDA. Under his command, the UDA was structured along British Army lines into battalions, companies, platoons and sections. The organisation drew more members, becoming the largest loyalist paramilitary organisation in Northern Ireland. Unlike its principal rival, the Ulster Volunteer Force (UVF), the UDA was legal. Anderson's own rank in the organisation was Major General; he served in its B Company, 2nd Battalion, West Belfast Brigade.

At the end of May 1972, Davy Fogel, leader of B Company and Harding Smith's second-in-command, erected the first UDA roadblocks and street barricades, making Woodvale, the area under Fogel's command, a no-go area. This was done with Anderson's approval and enthusiastic support. The operation attracted a great deal of media and press coverage, resulting in much publicity for the UDA. Anderson had been one of a number of leading UDA figures to discuss a settlement of the issue with British Army representatives on the ground, where amongst the offers made was the possibility of joint UDA-Army patrols on the Shankill. That summer the UDA marched through the streets of central Belfast in a massive demonstration of strength.

Anderson was part of a deputation from the "United Loyalist Council", an umbrella loyalist group comprising the UDA, Loyalist Association of Workers (LAW), members of the Orange Order, and led by the chairman of Vanguard Unionist Progressive Party, William Craig, who met with Secretary of State for Northern Ireland, William Whitelaw at Stormont on 19 December 1972.

Internal power struggle
In December 1972, Harding Smith and White were acquitted and returned to Belfast. Immediately after their return, a fierce power struggle ensued after Harding Smith declared to his associates: "I'm the boss. I take orders from no one". Fogel was promptly ousted from the B Company command, while the formidable East Belfast brigadier, Tommy Herron, appeared on the scene to challenge Harding Smith's leadership. Anderson became joint chairman of the UDA with Harding Smith. The struggle that ensued between Harding Smith and Herron overshadowed the Inner Council and during the height of the feud Anderson often had to call a register at its meetings, so poor were the turnouts. Herron and Anderson became linked and the East Belfast brigadier took to styling himself as deputy leader to Anderson, whom he treated as sole chairman.

By spring 1973, however, Fogel had already returned to his native England, and Anderson decided to stand down. He publicly announced his resignation as joint chairman in March 1973, in part because he was a fairly law-abiding individual who sat uneasily with violently chaotic figures like Harding Smith and Herron. It had been Anderson who had been one of the main thinkers behind the UDA's motto "Law Before Violence" although this was ditched shortly after his resignation in favour of "Quis separabit". As a compromise candidate between the rival factions of Harding Smith and Herron, Andy Tyrie, commander of West Belfast Brigade's A Company, was chosen as the UDA's chairman. He would soon become the UDA's Supreme Commander, a position he held until an attempted car bombing brought about his retirement in March 1988.

Subsequent activity
Anderson retained his UDA membership but no longer took an active role in the organisation. Notwithstanding this, however, he was still viewed by the Provisional IRA as a legitimate target. On 19 November 1974, as Anderson was in his glazier's shop with Billy Hull (who had also scaled back his active involvement in the UDA despite retaining his membership), an IRA gunman entered and shot both men several times. Neither man was killed in the attack. A call to the BBC initially led to the attack being described as the work of Ulster Young Militants, the youth wing of the UDA, but this proved to be a hoax and the attack was later shown to have been carried out by Provisional IRA members from Ardoyne.

References

Ulster Defence Association members
Paramilitaries from Belfast
1931 births
2019 deaths
Irish unionists
Glaziers